Faiza Shaheen (born 1982/1983) is a British academic in the field of economic inequality.

Early life and education
Shaheen was born in Leytonstone, in East London. Her father was a car mechanic from Fiji and her mother was a lab technician from Pakistan.

She attended Chingford Foundation School and St John's College, Oxford University, where she read philosophy, politics and economics. Shaheen also holds an MSc in Research Methods & Statistics and a PhD from the University of Manchester.

Career
From 2007 to 2009 Shaheen worked at the Centre for Cities, and before that at the Centre for Urban Policy Studies, University of Bristol. From 2009 to 2014 she was senior researcher on economic inequality at the New Economics Foundation, then until 2016 she was head of Inequality and Sustainable Development at Save the Children UK. From 2016 to 2021 she was the director of the Center for Labour and Social Studies (CLASS), a policy think tank originating from the trade union movement.

Shaheen is a regular contributor to debates on television news programmes, including Newsnight and Channel 4 News, and has worked with Channel 4 and the BBC to develop documentaries on inequality.

Since January 2021 Shaheen has been the Program Director, Inequality and Exclusion of the Pathfinders in the Peaceful, Just and Inclusive Societies program at the Center on International Cooperation, New York University. She is also visiting Professor in Practice at the International Inequalities Institute of the London School of Economics.

Politics
She is a longtime Labour voter and was politicised from an early age. She joined the Labour Party when Jeremy Corbyn became leader in 2015.

In 2017, The Guardian identified her as a "rising star". In the same year, she was nominated for Asian Woman of the Year at the Asian Achievers Awards and included in the Top 100 Influencers on the Left list.

In July 2018, she was selected to be the prospective parliamentary candidate for the Labour Party for Chingford and Woodford Green; at the 2019 General Election, she lost, finishing second behind the incumbent, Iain Duncan Smith.

Faiza was subsequently selected again in July 2022 to fight Chingford and Woodford Green as the Labour Party's Parliamentary candidate at the next United Kingdom general election.

Personal life
Shaheen is married to the actor Akin Gazi.

Bibliography

References

1983 births
Living people
Academics of the London School of Economics
Alumni of St John's College, Oxford
Alumni of the University of Manchester
British Muslims
British women economists
Center on International Cooperation
English people of Indo-Fijian descent
English people of Pakistani descent
Labour Party (UK) parliamentary candidates
People from Chingford